Minna Lehtola (born 24 January 1967) is a Finnish fencer. She competed in the individual épée event at the 1996 Summer Olympics.

References

External links
 

1967 births
Living people
Finnish female épée fencers
Olympic fencers of Finland
Fencers at the 1996 Summer Olympics
Sportspeople from Turku